Peter Kasper (born 20 December 1974) is an Austrian ice hockey player. He competed in the men's tournament at the 2002 Winter Olympics.

Personal life
His son, Marco Kasper, also plays hockey, and was drafted eighth overall by the Detroit Red Wings in the 2022 NHL Entry Draft.

External links

References

1974 births
Living people
Olympic ice hockey players of Austria
Ice hockey players at the 2002 Winter Olympics
Sportspeople from Klagenfurt